Improved may refer to:

 Improved clinch knot, a knot commonly used to secure a fishing line
 Improved-definition television (IDTV)
 Improved Touring, a category of classifications for cars in amateur road racing
 Improved Orion, an American research rocket
 LNWR Improved Precedent Class, a class of 2-4-0 steam locomotive originally designed for express passenger work

See also
 Most Improved Player (disambiguation), a sports award
 Past participle of Improvement